A Little More Magic is the twelfth studio album by American R&B singer Teddy Pendergrass. It was released by Elektra Records on September 14, 1993 in the United States. This was the third and last album Pendergrass recorded for Elektra, and was commercially the least successful of the three despite featuring songwriting and production credits from well-known names such as Barry White, Gerald Levert and Leon Huff as well as Reggie and Vincent Calloway.

The album peaked at number 92 on the USBillboard 200 and number 13 on the Top R&B/Hip-Hop Albums.  Whereas the two previous Pendergrass albums had each included an R&B chart-topping single to give sales impetus, the most successful single from A Little More Magic, "Believe in Love", stalled at number 14 on the R&B charts.

Track listing

Notes
  denotes a co-producer

Personnel 

Joe Alexander – engineer
Susan Becker – assistant engineer
Stephen Beckham – keyboards
Charles "Poogie" Bell, Jr. – drums
Chuckii Booker – guitar, overdubs
Randy Bowland – guitar
Tony Bridges – bass
Jay Bright – arranger, backing vocals
Craig Burbidge – mixing
Reggie Calloway – arranger, backing vocals, executive producer, drum programming, mixing
Vincent Calloway – trombone, trumpet, arranger, mellophonium, backing vocals, metaphone, producer, executive producer, horn arrangements, mixing
David Campbell – arranger, string arrangements
Scott Cannady – bass guitar
Rob Chiarelli – engineer, drum programming
Victor Emanuel Cooke – drums, keyboards, backing vocals, producer, drum programming, mixing
Joel Davis – keyboards, backing vocals
Michael J. Dexter – trombone
Curtis Dowd, Jr. – keyboards
Leon Evans – keyboards
Jack Faith – arranger, conductor
Christopher Farr – tenor saxophone
Charles Fearing – guitar
Carol Friedman – art direction, photography
Dean Gant – piano, keyboards
Mitch Goldfarb – engineer, mixing
Jason C. Golley – trumpet
Doug Grigsby – synthesizer
Leon Huff – piano, keyboards, producer, drum programming
Quinton Joseph – percussion, drum programming
Ron Kerber – trumpet, saxophone
Jim Krause – engineer
Gerald LeVert – arranger, backing vocals
Bobby Lovelace – drums, overdubs
Jeremy Lubbock – arranger, string arrangements
Dennis Matkosky – synthesizer, piano, keyboards
Taavi Mote – engineer
Derek Nakamoto – keyboards, keyboard programming
Edwin Nicholas – drums, keyboards, sequencing
William Patterson – electric guitar
Teddy Pendergrass – vocals, backing vocals, producer, executive producer, drum programming
Jack Perry – engineer
James Poyser – arranger, backing vocals
Land Richards – drums
Gene Robinson, Jr. – guitar
Keith Robinson – drum programming
Mike Ross – engineer
Michael Scalcione – engineer
Ron A. Schafer – engineer
Al Schmitt – engineer
William Simmons – keyboard programming
Norman Spratt – saxophone
Mike Mixx Tarisa – engineer
Pete Tokar – engineer
A. Daniel Tomassone – trombone, bass trombone
Gerald Veasley – bass
Freddie "Ready Freddie" Washington – bass
Dennis Wasko – trumpet
Dave Way – drums, drum programming
Barry White – producer
Dennis Williams – conductor, string arrangements
Bobby Wooten – arranger, keyboards
William Zaccagni – saxophone 
Joy Unlimited, Portia Griffin, Paula Halloway, Stacey Harcum, Annette Hardeman, Spencer Harris, D. Harvey, Charlene Holloway, Paula Holloway, Jeanne Jones, Kipper Jones, Patti LaBelle, Jean McClain, Frank McComb, Karen Roberts, Earl Robinson, Rene Robinson, Donnell Spencer, Lisa Stevens, Eddie Stockley, Elisabeth Williams, Youth Mass Choir, Bridget White, Darryl White, Fred White, Shaherha White, Kenny O. Bobiens – backing vocals

Charts

Weekly charts

Year-end charts

References

1993 albums
Teddy Pendergrass albums
Albums arranged by David Campbell (composer)
Albums produced by Leon Huff
Elektra Records albums